Luigi Fontana Russo (Trapani, January 15, 1868 - Trapani, 1953) was an Italian economist and lecturer.

Career 
Since 1907 he taught trade policy and customs law at the University of Rome. It was part of the school luzzattiana. From 1913 to 1919 he was Rector of the Royal Institute of Business Studies and Administrative Sapienza University of Rome. From 1928 he taught economic policy. He continued teaching until 1938. He was also President of the Bank of Italy. He organized the Federation of Italian owners.

References

Italian economists
1868 births
1953 deaths